The LAS (LASer) format is a file format designed for the interchange and archiving of lidar point cloud data. It is an open, binary format specified by the American Society for Photogrammetry and Remote Sensing (ASPRS). The format is widely used and regarded as an industry standard for lidar data.

File structure
A LAS file consists of the following overall sections:

Point data records
A LAS file contains point records in one of the point data record formats defined by the LAS specification; as of LAS 1.4, there are 11 point data record formats (0 through 10) available. All point data records must be of the same format within the file. The various formats differ in the data fields available, such as GPS time, RGB and NIR color and wave packet information.

The 3D point coordinates are represented within the point data records by 32-bit integers, to which a scaling and offset defined in the public header must be applied in order to obtain the actual coordinates.

As the number of bytes used per point data record is explicitly given in the public header block, it is possible to add user-defined fields in "extra bytes" to the fields given by the specification-defined point data record formats. A standardized way of interpreting such extra bytes was introduced in the LAS 1.4 specification, in the form of a specific EVLR.

Compression 
LAS file format is not compressed but there is an open source project LASzip which define the open file format LAZ to lossless compress LAS data.

References

External links
 LASer (LAS) File Format Exchange Activities at American Society for Photogrammetry and Remote Sensing
 Official ASPRS LAS Page on GitHub

GIS file formats